The Minister of the Environment and Climate Change (formerly Minister of the Environment) is one of the ministerial portfolios which comprise the Finnish Government. The minister heads the Ministry of the Environment and is responsible for the preparation of legal matters concerning communities, the built environment, housing, biodiversity, the sustainable use of natural resources, and environmental protection in Finland. The incumbent Minister of the Environment and Climate Change is Maria Ohisalo of the Green League.

List of Ministers of the Environment

References

'
Environment